Am-Djarass is a department within the Ennedi-Est region the Republic of Chad.

Its capital is the city of Amdjarass.

References

Departments of Chad
Chad geography articles needing translation from French Wikipedia